Edward Tervin Thomas (born September 27, 1974) is a former American football linebacker who played three seasons in the National Football League with the San Francisco 49ers and Jacksonville Jaguars. He played college football at Georgia Southern University and attended Charles Lincoln Harper High School in Atlanta, Georgia. He was also a member of the Montreal Alouettes, Tampa Bay Buccaneers, Oakland Raiders and Rhein Fire.

References

External links
Just Sports Stats
CFL trading card

Living people
1974 births
Players of American football from Georgia (U.S. state)
American football linebackers
Canadian football linebackers
African-American players of American football
African-American players of Canadian football
Georgia Southern Eagles football players
Montreal Alouettes players
San Francisco 49ers players
Jacksonville Jaguars players
Rhein Fire players
People from Thomasville, Georgia
21st-century African-American sportspeople
20th-century African-American sportspeople